St Mary’s School, Gerrards Cross is an independent day school for girls aged 3–18 situated in the heart of Gerrards Cross in South Buckinghamshire, England.

The current Head is Patricia Adams. There are around 350 pupils, 110 of whom are in the Prep Department.

History 
St Mary’s School was established in 1872 by the Anglican Foundation of The Sister of the Community of St Mary the Virgin in Paddington, London. However the finances became precarious and in 1901 the college was relaunched by a new management committee. Jane Latham became the principal of both the college and the school. In 1904 the school passed its inspection and Latham was credited with much of the improvement. Latham left the school to establish a new career as a missionary in India.

The school relocated to Lancaster Gate in 1911, where it was known as St Mary’s College. In 1937 the school relocated to its present site, Orchehill House, in Gerrards Cross.

The religious teaching in the school has changed since it was first established by the Community of St Mary the Virgin but the school remains associated with the Church of England, though girls of all religions and denominations are admitted.

In 2016 the Sixth Form facilities were upgraded with the opening of Cedar House and a new classroom block, Cherry Tree House, was added in 2018.

Facilities 

The school has traditional buildings with period features as well as new classroom blocks, providing a wide range of facilities. Pre-Prep are in Paddington House, whilst the remaining year groups of the Prep Department are in the Oakdene and Smith buildings.

Senior House is in Orchehill House, the original building, as well as Cherry Tree House. The Sixth Form is in a dedicated facility, Cedar House.

Co-curricular 
There is a range of co-curricular clubs available in both the Prep Department and Senior School including tap dancing, chess, gymnastics, crafting, a wide variety of sports, language clubs, cookery, puzzle club, football, Economics Society, media club, dance, playwriting, choirs, orchestra and bands, book club, drama club, street dance, debating, the Duke of Edinburgh awards.

Headteachers 

 Sister Kate (C.S.M.V), 1874
 Sister Mary Louisa (C.S.M.V), 1876
 Sister Mary Monica (C.S.M.V), 1877
 Sister Geraldine (C.S.M.V), 1885
 Sister Louisa (C.S.M.V), 1885
 Sister Mary Margaret (C.S.M.V), 1886
 Sister Madeline (C.S.M.V), 1886
 Jane Leeke Latham, 1901-1909
 Helena Powell, 1909-1925
 Dorothy Apperson, 1925-1942
 Winifred Joan Chalk, 1942-1967
 Hazel Thomas, 1967-1969
 Victor Joseph Bailey, 1969-1973
 Audrey Timberlake, 1973-1984
 Joan Lilwall Smith, 1984-1995
 Fanny Balcombe, 1995-2010
 Jean Ross, 2010-2018
 Patricia Adams

Notable alumnae 
 Gwyneth Bebb, the first woman to graduate from Oxford with a First in Jurisprudence; she was the only woman in her undergraduate class of 400. She argued Bebb v. The Law Society (1913) which, while the judgement was against her, led the way to women being admitted to the legal profession in Britain in 1919.
Marie Laura Violet Gayler, Metallurgist working on aluminium alloys and dental amalgams. One of two first women scientific staff at the National Physical Laboratory.
 Tessa Hilton, a British magazine executive and former newspaper editor.
Lin Huiyin, a famous writer and the first female architect in modern China.

References

External links 
 
 St Mary's School, Gerrards Cross listing at Independent Schools Council
 St Mary's School, Gerrards Cross listing at Girls' Schools Association

1872 establishments in England
Gerrards Cross
Educational institutions established in 1872
Private schools in Buckinghamshire
Girls' schools in Buckinghamshire